Hillen is a small community just west of Hillen Road and Morgan State University and south of Coldspring Lane in Baltimore, Maryland, United States.

Demographics
According to the 2000 US Census, 2,670 people live in Hillen with 90.4% African-American and 6.6% White. The median household income is $50,417. 91.6% of the houses are occupied and 78.1% of them are occupied by the home's owner.

Notable residents
Curt Anderson -member, Maryland House of Delegates
Joan Carter Conway -member, Maryland State Senate

History
Hillen Road is named for the Hillen Estate.  The Hillen family included Colonel Solomon Hillen and Solomon Hillen, Jr., who served as a member of the United States Congress and mayor of Baltimore during the 1840s.

Government Representation

References

Neighborhoods in Baltimore
Northeast Baltimore